Geniposidic acid is a natural chemical compound, classified as an iridoid glucoside, found in a variety of plants including Eucommia ulmoides and Gardenia jasminoides.

References 

Iridoid glycosides
Glucosides
Carboxylic acids
Cyclopentenes